Robert Walker Heathcote (7 April 1847 – 8 April 1918) was a British archer.  He competed at the 1908 Summer Olympics in London. Heathcote entered the men's double York round event in 1908, taking 14th place with 476 points.

References

External links
 
 
 Robert Heathcote's profile at Sports Reference.com

1847 births
1918 deaths
Archers at the 1908 Summer Olympics
Olympic archers of Great Britain
British male archers